In mathematics, the term supercompact may refer to:
 In set theory, a supercompact cardinal
 In topology, a supercompact space.